Digama spilosomoides is a moth of the  family Erebidae. It is found in Africa,  including South Africa.

External links
 Species info

Aganainae
Moths described in 1865
Moths of Africa
Insects of South Africa